Foreign policy of the Bush administration may refer to:
 Foreign policy of the George H. W. Bush administration, the foreign policy of the United States from 1989 to 1993
 Foreign policy of the George W. Bush administration, the foreign policy of the United States from 2001 to 2009

United States foreign policy
B